Gordon Tootoosis,  (October 25, 1941 – July 5, 2011) was a First Nations actor of Cree and Stoney descent. Tootoosis was a descendant of Yellow Mud Blanket, brother of the famous Cree leader Pîhtokahanapiwiyin. He was acclaimed for his commitment to preserving his culture and to telling his people's stories. He once said, "Leadership is about submission to duty, not elevation to power." He served as a founding member of the board of directors of the Saskatchewan Native Theatre Company. Tootoosis offered encouragement, support and training to aspiring Aboriginal actors. He served as a leading Cree activist both as a social worker and as a band chief. In Open Season and Boog and Elliot's Midnight Bun Run, Tootoosis was the voice of Sheriff Gordy.

He was awarded membership in the Order of Canada on October 29, 2004. The investiture ceremony took place on September 9, 2005. His citation recognizes him as an inspirational role model for Aboriginal youth. It notes that as a veteran actor, he portrayed memorable characters in movie and television productions in Canada and the United States.

Career
His first acting role was in the film Alien Thunder (1974), alongside Chief Dan George and Donald Sutherland. He portrayed Albert Golo in 52 episodes of North of 60 in the 1990s. He is best known to British audiences for playing the Native American Joe Saugus, who negotiates the purchase of the Middlesbrough Transporter Bridge in Auf Wiedersehen, Pet series 3 (2002).  Tootoosis appeared in the CBC Television mini-series By Way of the Stars with Eric Schweig as Black Thunder and Tantoo Cardinal as Franoise. He appeared in the award-winning movie Legends of the Fall (1994), and starred with Russell Means in Disney's Pocahontas (1995) and Song of Hiawatha (1997). In 1999, he and Tantoo Cardinal became founding members of the board of directors of the Saskatchewan Native Theatre Company. In 2011, he appeared in Gordon Winter at the Persephone Theatre in Saskatoon and Prairie Scene in Ottawa, his first stage role in 15 years.

Tootoosis won a Gemini Award for his work on the animated show Wapos Bay: The Series and was nominated twice for his work on North of 60.

Personal life and death
Tootoosis was raised with his 13 siblings in the Plains Cree tradition until he was forced from his home; taking indigenous children away from their communities and into residential schools was Canadian government policy at the time. Tootoosis was placed in a Catholic residential school, where he was treated harshly and forbidden to speak his own language. His father John Tootoosis was an activist for aboriginal rights, which got the younger Tootoosis into trouble at school. After his traumatic school years, Tootoosis went into social work, specializing in work with children and young offenders. His interest in his own cultural traditions led him to become an accomplished native dancer and rodeo roper, and he toured with the Plains InterTribal Dance Troupe in the 1960s and 1970s throughout Canada, Europe and South America, becoming one of North America's most popular powwow announcers. His father was one of the founders of the National Indian Brotherhood and former head of the Federation of Saskatchewan Indian Nations (FSIN). Gordon himself served as the chief of his band and as a vice-president of FSIN. Tootoosis married Irene Seseequasis in 1965. They had three daughters, Glynis, Alanna and Disa, three sons, Lee, Winston Bear, and Clint. After their daughter Glynnis died of cancer in 1997, they took the responsibility of raising her four children in Saskatoon.

Tootoosis died on July 5, 2011, aged 69, after being hospitalized for pneumonia at St. Paul's Hospital in Saskatoon. His funeral and interment were held on the Poundmaker Cree Nation Reserve in Cut Knife. In 2015, the Saskatchewan Native Theatre Company changed its name to the Gordon Tootoosis Nīkānīwin Theatre Company in honour of Tootoosis.

Selected filmography

 Alien Thunder (1974) as Almighty Voice
 Marie-Anne (1978) as Chief Many Horses
 The Mad Trapper (1978)
 Red Serge (1986, TV Series) as Sioux Chief / Chief Mighty Buffalo
 Stone Fox (1987, TV Movie) as Stone Fox
 Airwolf (1987, TV Series) as Charlie Rising Moon
 MacGyver (1988-1991, TV Series) as Phil Crow / Perry
 Friday the 13th: The Series (1989, TV Series) as Spotted Owl
 Black Robe (1991) as Old Aenons
 Leaving Normal (1992) as Hank Amaruk
 Call of the Wild (1992, TV Movie) as Charlie
 By Way of the Stars (1992-1993, TV Mini-Series) as The Cree Chief
   The Spirit Rider (1993) Film “ as Joe Moon
 North of 60 (1992-1997, TV series) as Albert Golo
 Northern Exposure (1993, TV Series) as Ed's father, Pete
 Hawkeye (1994, TV Series) as Ravenoak
 Lonesome Dove: The Series (1994, TV Series) as Indian John
 Legends of the Fall (1994) as One Stab
 500 Nations (1995, TV Mini-Series) (voice)
 Pocahontas: The Legend (1995) as Chief Powhatan
 Pocahontas (1995) as Kekata (voice)
 The X-Files (1996, TV Series) as Shaman
 Lone Star (1996) as Wesley Birdsong
 Crazy Horse (1996, TV Movie) as Akicita
 Alaska (1996) as Ben Quincy General Store
 Coyote Summer (1996) as Mopeah
 Four Directions: A Canoe for the Making (1996, TV Series)
 Keeping the Promise (1997, TV Movie) as Chief Saknis
 The Edge (1997) as Jack Hawk
 Song of Hiawatha (1997) as Iagoo
 Forgotten Warriors (1997, Short documentary) as Narrator
 The Gift of the Grandfathers (1997, TV Short documentary) as Narrator
 The Magnificent Seven (1998, TV Series) as Chief Ko-Je
 Que la lumière soit (1998) as Indian God
 Due South (1998, TV Series) as Tom Quinn
 Dead Man's Gun (1998, TV Series) as Charlie Three Claws
 Big Bear (1998, TV Mini-Series) as Chief Big Bear
 Lakota Moon (1999, TV Movie) as Rolling Thunder
 Reindeer Games (2000) as Old Governor
 Bear with Me (2000) as John Ours
 Nobody's Baby (2001) as Dog Havasu
 Zoe (2001) as Red Shirt
 The Doe Boy (2001) as Marvin
 Dream Storm: A North of 60 Mystery (2001, TV Movie) as Albert Golo
 Christmas at Wapos Bay (2002) as Mushom
 Auf Wiedersehen, Pet (2002, TV Series) as Joe Saugus
 Black Point (2002) as Standing Bear
 Now & Forever (2002) as Ghost Fox
 Smallville (2002-2004, TV Series) as Joseph Willowbrook
 On the Corner (2003) as Floyd
 Dreamkeeper (2003, TV Movie) as Kills Enemy
 Moccasin Flats (2003-2006, TV Series) as Joe Redsky
 Seven Times Lucky (2004) as Mr. Five Wounds
 The Making of 'DreamKeeper''' (2004, Video documentary short) as Himself
 Hank Williams First Nation (2005) as Adelard Fox
 Into the West (2005, TV Mini-Series) as Growling Bear
 Fugitives Run (2005) as Dan John
 Shania: A Life in Eight Albums (2005, TV Movie) as Greey Twain
 Shoebox Zoo (2005, TV Series) as Nathaniel Stonebear
 The Spirit of Norway House (2005, TV Movie documentary) as Narrator
 Wapos Bay: The Series (2005–2010, TV Series) as Mushom (voice)
 Dream Makers (2006, Documentary) as Himself
 That Beautiful Somewhere (2006) as Harold
 Open Season (2006) as Sheriff Gordy (voice)
 Boog and Elliot's Midnight Bun Run (2006, Video short) as Sheriff Gordy (voice)
 Mr. Soul (2006) as Clifford
 Bury My Heart at Wounded Knee (2007, TV Movie) as Red Cloud
 Out in the Cold (2008, Short) as Soft as Snow
 Blackstone (2009-2011, TV Series) as Cecil Delaronde
 For Love of Liberty: The Story of America's Black Patriots (2010, TV Movie documentary) (voice)
 Doomsday Prophecy (2011, TV Movie) as John
 Wapos Bay: Long Goodbyes (2011) as Mushom
 Guns, Girls and Gambling'' (2012) as The Chief (final film role)

See also
 John Tootoosis
 National Indian Brotherhood
 Federation of Saskatchewan Indian Nations

References

External links
Gordon Tootoosis at The Canadian Encyclopedia
 

1941 births
2011 deaths
20th-century Canadian male actors
20th-century First Nations people
21st-century Canadian male actors
21st-century First Nations people
Canadian male film actors
Canadian male television actors
Canadian male voice actors
Canadian Screen Award winners
Cree people
First Nations male actors
Deaths from pneumonia in Saskatchewan
Male actors from Saskatchewan
Members of the Order of Canada
Nakoda (Stoney) people